The Raging River is a tributary of the Snoqualmie River in western Washington state in the United States. It is located in the western foothills of the Cascade Mountains in east central King County, Washington. It gets its name from the large amount of water it sometimes carries. The Raging is a salmon-bearing river and supports one-fifth of the Snoqualmie River's chinook runs.

The river begins in the valley formed by Rattlesnake Ridge to the east and Taylor Mountain to the west in the Raging River State Forest, managed by the Washington Department of Natural Resources. It flows northwest, crossing State Route 18, and then continues north past Tiger Mountain, crossing Interstate 90 near Preston, Washington, and joining the Snoqualmie River near Fall City, Washington. The Raging River watershed is part of the larger Puget Sound drainage basin.

History
Until 2009, almost half of the Raging River basin was privately owned. In the spring of that year, the Washington Department of Natural Resources and King County partnered to purchase , filling a large gap in the Mountains to Sound Greenway.

Hiking and biking
The Preston-Snoqualmie Trail follows along the Raging River and Preston-Fall City Road for a 3½ mile stretch and continues toward Snoqualmie Falls.  The trail is bike and dog friendly.

In the winter of 2012 the Washington Department of Natural Resources began a public planning activity to guide the development of recreation opportunities in the Snoqualmie Corridor, including specifically the Raging River State Forest.

Kayaking

See also 
List of rivers of Washington
Snohomish River

References

External links 
 
 
 

Rivers of Washington (state)
Rivers of King County, Washington